Cat Island was a Marshy Eroding Island in Cat Bay, Louisiana. It was a nesting ground of pelicans and other birds.

The island started to show signs of erosion in the 1990s. During the BP oil spill, the island was heavily affected and the plants that once kept the island from erosion disappeared.

References

Former islands of the United States
Islands of Louisiana